Sant is a sum (district) of Övörkhangai Province in southern Mongolia. In 2008, its population was 3,525.

References 

Districts of Övörkhangai Province